Woolbeding and Pound Commons is a  biological Site of Special Scientific Interest north of Midhurst in West Sussex.

The commons have areas of wet and dry heath, woodland, ponds and wet flushes. Invertebrates include a number of Red Data Book species, such as the bee Hylaeus gibbus, the Eumenes coarctatus and Psen bruxellensis wasps and the click-beetle Hylis olexai. The site also provides a habitat for three rare birds, woodlark,  nightjar and Dartford warbler.

The site is crossed by roads and footpaths.

References

External links

Sites of Special Scientific Interest in West Sussex